Makhmalbaf Film House is a film production company started by Mohsen Makhmalbaf and his family in Iran. The production company, which comprises all his family members, continues to produce films from the United Kingdom. Their latest production was The Gardener distributed by KDK Factory.

A number of books have been written about this production company and their importance in world cinema. The production house has produced more than 20 films in the past few decades.

Members

Mohsen Makhmalbaf
Samira Makhmalbaf
Maysam Makhmalbaf
Hana Makhmalbaf
Marziyeh Meshkiny

Films

References

Film production companies of Iran